The 1994–95 NBA season was the 27th season for the Phoenix Suns in the National Basketball Association. During the off-season, the Suns signed free agents, All-Star forward Danny Manning, Wayman Tisdale, and Danny Schayes. The team was led by Paul Westphal, in his third year as head coach of the Suns. The Suns held the league's best record at 38–10 before the All-Star break, and finished the regular season with 59 wins and 23 losses, the first time in the franchise's history they had ended the season with 55 or more wins for three consecutive seasons. All home games were played at America West Arena.

All-Star forward Charles Barkley averaged 23.0 points, 11.1 rebounds and 1.6 steals per game, while Manning, who was coming off an All-Star year, averaged 17.9 points and 6.0 rebounds per game, but the oft-injured Manning appeared in only just 46 games in his first season in Phoenix, and would not be available for the Suns' playoff run due to a torn ligament in his left knee. In addition, point guard Kevin Johnson averaged 15.5 points and led the team with 7.7 assists per game, despite only playing just 47 games due to injuries, which happened earlier enough in the season, that he would be able to play in the Suns' fourth consecutive Western Conference Semi-finals, and three-point specialist Dan Majerle provided the team with 15.6 points per game, and finished the season tied for second in made three-point field goals at 199. The Suns front court was supplanted by A.C. Green, who provided with 11.2 points and 8.2 rebounds per game, and Tisdale, who contributed 10.0 points per game. The Suns' pick in the draft was used to select Wesley Person, a shooting guard out of Auburn, who contributed 10.4 points per game while connecting on a team-high 43.6% of his three-pointers. By season's end, Person was selected to the NBA All-Rookie Second Team. Elliot Perry played most of the season as the team's starting point guard in Johnson's absence, as he averaged 9.7 points, 4.8 assists and led the Suns with 1.9 steals per game, and Danny Ainge contributed 7.7 points per game off the bench.

The Suns swept the Portland Trail Blazers in three straight games in the Western Conference First Round of the playoffs. In the Western Conference Semi-finals, the Suns took a 3–1 series lead over the 6th-seeded defending champion Houston Rockets, but for the second year in a row, had their playoff run stopped in a Game 7 home loss to the Rockets. The Rockets would go on to defeat the Orlando Magic in four straight games in the NBA Finals, winning their second consecutive championship.

Barkley was named to his ninth All-Star Game, which was hosted in Phoenix, joined by Majerle, who was selected for his third and final All-Star Game; Westphal was also selected to coach the Western Conference in the All-Star Game. Barkley repeated as an All-NBA Second Team selection. Following the season, Majerle was traded to the Cleveland Cavaliers, while Ainge retired, Richard Dumas signed as a free agent with the Philadelphia 76ers, Schayes signed with the Miami Heat during the next season, and undrafted rookie guard Trevor Ruffin left in the 1995 NBA Expansion Draft.

For the season, the Suns added new black alternate road uniforms, which remained in use until 2000.

Draft picks

Roster

Regular season

Standings

Record vs. opponents

Regular season

Game log

|- align="center" bgcolor="#ffcccc"
| 24
| December 22, 19946:00p.m. MST
| @ Houston
| L 106–114
| Manning (23)
| Barkley (14)
| Manning, Perry (6)
| The Summit16,611
| 18–6

|- align="center" bgcolor="#ffcccc"
| 46
| February 5, 19951:30p.m. MST
| Houston
| L 100–124
| Barkley (24)
| Barkley (11)
| Barkley (7)
| America West Arena19,023
| 36–10
|- align="center"
|colspan="9" bgcolor="#bbcaff"|All-Star Break
|- style="background:#cfc;"
|- bgcolor="#bbffbb"

|- align="center" bgcolor="#ccffcc"
| 60
| March 7, 19956:00p.m. MST
| @ Houston
| W 113–102
| Barkley (26)
| Barkley (14)
| Johnson (11)
| The Summit16,611
| 46–14
|- align="center" bgcolor="#ffcccc"
| 68
| March 24, 19957:00p.m. MST
| Houston
| L 97–99
| Barkley (34)
| Barkley (26)
| Johnson (10)
| America West Arena19,023
| 49–19

Playoffs

Game log

|- align="center" bgcolor="#ccffcc"
| 1
| April 28
| Portland
| W 129–102
| Charles Barkley (29)
| Charles Barkley (16)
| Kevin Johnson (10)
| America West Arena19,023
| 1–0
|- align="center" bgcolor="#ccffcc"
| 2
| April 30
| Portland
| W 103–94
| Kevin Johnson (28)
| A. C. Green (15)
| Kevin Johnson (6)
| America West Arena19,023
| 2–0
|- align="center" bgcolor="#ccffcc"
| 3
| May 2
| @ Portland
| W 117–109
| Charles Barkley (47)
| Charles Barkley (12)
| Kevin Johnson (11)
| Memorial Coliseum12,888
| 3–0

|- align="center" bgcolor="#ccffcc"
| 1
| May 9, 19957:30p.m. MST
| Houston
| W 130–108
| Barkley (26)
| Green (15)
| Johnson (13)
| America West Arena19,023
| 1–0
|- align="center" bgcolor="#ccffcc"
| 2
| May 11, 19957:30p.m. MST
| Houston
| W 118–94
| Barkley (30)
| Green (14)
| Johnson (12)
| America West Arena19,023
| 2–0
|- align="center" bgcolor="#ffcccc"
| 3
| May 13, 199510:00a.m. MST
| @ Houston
| L 85–118
| Johnson (14)
| Green (9)
| Ainge, Barkley, Johnson (4)
| The Summit16,611
| 2–1
|- align="center" bgcolor="#ccffcc"
| 4
| May 14, 199510:00a.m. MST
| @ Houston
| W 114–110
| Johnson (43)
| Green (12)
| Johnson (9)
| The Summit16,611
| 3–1
|- align="center" bgcolor="#ffcccc"
| 5
| May 16, 19957:30p.m. MST
| Houston
| L 97–103 (OT)
| Johnson (28)
| Barkley, Green (20)
| Johnson (8)
| America West Arena19,023
| 3–2
|- align="center" bgcolor="#ffcccc"
| 6
| May 18, 19955:30p.m. MST
| @ Houston
| L 103–116
| Barkley (34)
| Barkley (14)
| Johnson (10)
| The Summit16,611
| 3–3
|- align="center" bgcolor="#ffcccc"
| 7
| May 20, 199512:30p.m. MST
| Houston
| L 114–115
| Johnson (46)
| Barkley (23)
| Johnson (10)
| America West Arena19,023
| 3–4
|-

Awards and honors

Week/Month
 Elliot Perry was named Player of the Week for games played November 14 through November 20.
 Charles Barkley was named Player of the Week for games played February 13 through February 19.

All-Star
 Charles Barkley was voted as a starter for the Western Conference in the All-Star Game. It was his ninth consecutive All-Star selection. Barkley finished first in voting among Western Conference forwards with 1,046,105 votes.
 Dan Majerle was voted as a starter for the Western Conference in the All-Star Game. It was his third All-Star selection. Majerle finished first in voting among Western Conference guards with 868,115 votes.
 Paul Westphal coached the Western Conference in the All-Star Game, which was held in Phoenix for the second time. The West defeated the East 139–112.
 Other Suns players receiving All-Star votes were: Danny Manning (327,554).
 Dan Majerle was selected to compete in the Three-Point Shootout. Majerle was eliminated in the first round.
 Wesley Person and Trevor Ruffin were selected to play in the Rookie Challenge.

Season
 Charles Barkley was named to the All-NBA Second Team. Barkley also finished sixth in MVP voting.
 Wesley Person was named to the NBA All-Rookie Second Team.
 Elliot Perry finished second in Most Improved Player voting.

Injuries/Missed games
 10/08/94: Richard Dumas: League suspension (failed drug test); reinstated March 13
 11/03/94: Charles Barkley: Strained stomach muscle; placed on injured list until November 26
 11/03/94: Aaron Swinson: Sprained ankle; placed on injured list until November 15
 11/11/94: Kevin Johnson: Sprained rib cage muscle; out until November 18
 11/12/94: Danny Ainge: Flu; did not play
 11/15/94: Antonio Lang: Back spasms; placed on injured list until February 6
 11/16/94: Wayman Tisdale: Sprained ankle; out until November 29
 11/23/94: Kevin Johnson: Sore knee; did not play
 11/26/94: Kevin Johnson: Strained groin; placed on injured list until December 12
 11/27/94: Charles Barkley: Strained stomach muscle; did not play
 12/12/94: Kevin Johnson: Strained groin; did not play
 12/12/94: Aaron Swinson: Knee tendinitis; placed on injured list until December 29
 01/03/95: Kevin Johnson: Strained quadriceps; out until January 22
 01/03/95: Wayman Tisdale: Flu; did not play
 01/26/95: Kevin Johnson: Strained quadriceps; out until February 19
 01/29/95: Wesley Person: Sore foot; out until February 3
 02/03/95: Wayman Tisdale: Separated rib cartilage; out until February 17
 02/06/95: Danny Manning: Torn ACL; placed on injured list for rest of season
 02/17/95: Danny Ainge: League suspension (punched Chris Dudley on February 15); did not play
 02/26/95: Joe Kleine: Personal reasons; did not play
 02/28/95: Charles Barkley: Sprained knee; did not play
 03/01/95: Charles Barkley: Sprained knee; did not play
 03/14/95: Wayman Tisdale: Strained rib; placed on injured reserve until March 24
 03/24/95: Trevor Ruffin: Bruised shoulder; did not play
 03/24/95: Antonio Lang: Sprained knee; placed on injured list for rest of season
 03/31/95: Richard Dumas: Urinary tract infection; did not play
 04/02/95: Richard Dumas: Urinary tract infection; did not play
 04/09/95: Danny Ainge: Bruised knee, sore back; did not play
 04/09/95: Danny Ainge: Bruised knee, sore back; did not play
 04/15/95: Charles Barkley: League suspension (exceeded flagrant foul limit); did not play
 05/09/95: Richard Dumas: Bruised wrist; out until waived on May 18

Player statistics

Season

† – Minimum 300 field goals made.
^ – Minimum 50 three-pointers made.
# – Minimum 125 free-throws made.
+ – Minimum 50 games played.

Playoffs

^ – Minimum 5 three-pointers made.

Transactions

Trades

Free agents

Additions

Subtractions

Player Transactions Citation:

References

External links
 Standings on Basketball Reference

Phoenix Suns seasons